Buckhorn (or Cheeks Crossroads), is an unincorporated community in Orange County, North Carolina, United States, located south of Miles.

References

Unincorporated communities in North Carolina
Unincorporated communities in Orange County, North Carolina